Douglas Philip Dumbleton (27 April 1918 – 4 March 2005) was a New Zealand cricket umpire from Wellington. He stood in two Test matches at the Basin Reserve in Wellington in 1963 and 1964. 

Dumbleton played one first-class match for Wellington in the Plunket Shield in the 1940s. He umpired 17 first-class matches between 1954 and 1969, all but one of them at the Basin Reserve. He was a leading figure in the formation of the New Zealand Umpires' Association, and became its first life member.

See also
 List of Test cricket umpires
 English cricket team in New Zealand in 1962–63
 South African cricket team in New Zealand in 1963–64

References

1918 births
2005 deaths
Cricketers from Wellington City
New Zealand Test cricket umpires
New Zealand cricketers
Wellington cricketers